Estradiol 17-beta-dehydrogenase 11 is an enzyme that in humans is encoded by the HSD17B11 gene.

References

Further reading